St. Mary's Diocesan School for Girls is an Anglican private boarding school for girls situated in Hillcrest, Pretoria in the Gauteng province of South Africa, St Mary's DSG was founded in 1879 by the Rt Revd Henry Bousfield, the first Bishop of Pretoria. For 75 years of its existence the school was run by the nuns of the Community of St Mary the Virgin, The brother school is St. Alban's College.

The school was established in 1871 by Henry Bousfield known as St Etheldreda's but it became St Mary's DSG later on, it's known as the oldest schools in Pretoria, It is one of the most prestigious schools in South Africa.

History

St Etheldreda's 18791909 
The school was known as St Etheldreda by Bishop Henry Bousfield, it became St Mary's DSG later. initially it was situated at No.279 Skinner Street. Before moved to Hillcrest. 

The school started to have 20 pupils in 1886 and 75 pupils in 1889, The school costed £1,500 of which only £300 was immediately available. The rest was raised by the Bishop and friends by 1895, 138 pupils and nine academic member of staff.

St Mary's DSG establishment 
Henry Bousfield died and all seemed lost, The Headmistress resigned and return to England and 25 pupils remained at St Etheldreda's, The Education Department suggested that the school buildings might be used as a hostel for the newly established girls high school in Arcadia called Pretoria High School for Girls.

When the Bishop William Carter was appointed as second Bishop of Pretoria (19031909), he fervently opposed the absorbing of church schools by the government, It was his inspiration that saved our school: he invited the Community of St Mary the Virgin from Wantage in England to take it over and the Community accepted. However, they were not able to send sisters to South Africa until September 1903. So far for nine months, Miss Grenfell kept the school going, Finally the great day came when the tour Sisters arrived at the Pretoria station in September 1903, A new era dawned during which the school developed into an efficient highly regarded and institution under the capable and loving guidance of Sisters. The name St Etheldreda's was not heard from the war and by the time of the school became St Mary's Diocesan School for Girls also known as the  DSG.

The year 2004 gave the school further opportunity to celebrate: 125 years of the best that a holistic education has to offer.

Sports
 Athletics
 Basketball
 Chess 
 Cross country
 
 Equestrian
 Hockey
 Netball
  
 Soccer 
 Squash
 Swimming
  
 Tennis
 Volleyball

Notes and references

External links 

 

Anglican schools in South Africa
Boarding schools in South Africa
Private schools in Gauteng
Schools in Pretoria
Educational institutions established in 1879
Girls' schools in South Africa
1879 establishments in the South African Republic
Christianity in Pretoria